Werneth Cricket Club, based in the Werneth area of Oldham, Greater Manchester, England, are an English cricket team currently playing in the Central Lancashire League.

Established in 1894, Werneth play their home games at The Coppice and have produced cricketers such as Jason Gallian, Gary Yates and Alan Durose and Australian superstar Shaun Perris.

References

External links 
 http://www.cll.org.uk/Clubs/Werneth.html

References

Central Lancashire League cricket clubs
Sport in Oldham
Cricket in Greater Manchester
Organisations based in Oldham